Frank Kellogg Allan (May 9, 1935 - May 24, 2019) was the eighth bishop of the Episcopal Diocese of Atlanta from 1989 till 2000.

Background
Allan was born in Hammond, Indiana. He graduated from Emory University in 1956, and in 1959 he received his Master of Divinity from the University of the South in Sewanee, Tennessee.

He was ordained as deacon and later as priest by Bishop Randolph R. Claiborne Jr. in 1959, and served at St. Mark's Episcopal Church in Dalton, Georgia, for eight years. In 1967 Allan became rector of St. Paul's Episcopal Church in Macon, Georgia, where he served until 1977. Allan's time at St. Paul's coincided with rising political consciousness: he once delivered a sermon on women's rights that was interrupted and denounced by a woman in the congregation for its progressive stand; he later said that from that time on he never began a sermon without expecting to be interrupted. From St. Paul's, Allan went to St. Anne's Episcopal Church in Atlanta.

In 1987 Bishop C. Judson Child consecrated Allan as Bishop Coadjutor for the Diocese of Atlanta. When Bishop Child retired, Bishop Allan became Bishop of Atlanta per the Constitution and Canons of the Episcopal Church (1989). He was consecrated as Coadjutor Bishop on February 7, 1987, and became diocesan bishop on January 1, 1989.

After retiring, Bishop Allan taught at the Candler School of Theology at Emory University. He also began a ministry called the Work of Our Hands to provide arts and crafts to under-served communities. Bishop Allan is remembered for his supportive role in the ordination of women in the diocese.

Consecrators
 Edmond Lee Browning, 24th Presiding Bishop
 Charles Judson Child, Jr., 7th Bishop of Atlanta
 William Evan Sanders, 1st Bishop of East Tennessee
 Bennett Jones Sims, 6th Bishop of Atlanta
Frank K. Allan was the 818th bishop consecrated in the Episcopal Church.

See also
 Episcopal Diocese of Atlanta
 List of Bishop Succession in the Episcopal Church

References
 Atlanta Diocese Centennial History  page on Bishop Allan.
 The Episcopal Church Annual. Morehouse Publishing: New York, NY (2005).

1935 births
2019 deaths
People from Hammond, Indiana
Episcopal bishops of Atlanta
Emory University alumni
Sewanee: The University of the South alumni
People from Dalton, Georgia
People from Macon, Georgia
20th-century American Episcopalians